PD-128,907 is a drug used in scientific research which acts as a potent and selective agonist for the dopamine D2 and D3 receptors. It is used for studying the role of these receptors in the brain, in roles such as inhibitory autoreceptors that act to limit further dopamine release, as well as release of other neurotransmitters. In animal studies, it has been shown to reduce toxicity from cocaine overdose.

See also 
 7-OH-DPAT
 PF-219,061
 PF-592,379

References 

Dopamine agonists
Benzopyrans
Phenols
Phenylmorpholines